Fortress is a 2021 American action film directed by James Cullen Bressack and written by Alan Horsnail, based on a story by Emile Hirsch and Randall Emmett. It stars Jesse Metcalfe, Bruce Willis, Chad Michael Murray, Kelly Greyson, Ser'Darius Blain, and Shannen Doherty. The film was released in select theaters and on video on demand by Lionsgate Films on December 17, 2021.

Plot
Robert lives in a top-secret resort for retired U.S. intelligence officers. His son Paul tracks him down to the facility after 3 years of not seeing or hearing from him. He pitches his crypto currency company to him telling him that he needs $5 million to make it cash positive. He needs him to sign a document to release money from his mom's estate to him. Unbeknown to him his dad has been following his son's life and career. Balzary and his group of criminals infiltrate the resort and follow Robert and Paul into a high-tech bunker called the fortress, killing all the guards. They tie them up. Balzary says a group of Russians have kidnapped his wife and he needs the money that Robert stole from him fòr her release. Robert has invested it in Crypto currency. He has his son memorise the code saying he must remember the number exactly as it could save his life.

Cast
 Jesse Metcalfe as Paul Michaels
 Bruce Willis as Robert Michaels
 Chad Michael Murray as Frederick Balzary
 Kelly Greyson as Kate Taylor 
 Ser'Darius Blain as Ulysses
 Michael Sirow as Ken Blain
 Shannen Doherty as Brigadier General Barbara Dobbs
 Katalina Viteri as Sophia
 Natalie Burn as Sandra 
 Luis Da Silva Jr. as Axel
 Sean Kanan as Vlad
 Lauren Schiff as Garner

Production
Filming began on May 3, 2021, in Puerto Rico. The film was announced that same day as the first part in a duology of films starring Jesse Metcalfe, Bruce Willis, Chad Michael Murray, and Kelly Greyson. The second film, titled Fortress: Sniper's Eye, was shot back-to-back with the first; production on the second film concluded on November 3, 2021. On May 15, 2021, director James Cullen Bressack said filming on the first film had wrapped.

Release
The film was released in select theaters and on video on demand by Lionsgate Films on December 17, 2021.

Box office
As of August 27, 2022, Fortress grossed $52,169 in the United Arab Emirates and Portugal.

Critical reception
 At the 42nd Golden Raspberry Awards, the film received a nomination in a new category: Worst Performance by Bruce Willis in a 2021 Movie. The category was later rescinded after Willis' retirement due to aphasia.

Accolades

Sequel

References

External links
 

2021 films
2021 action films
2021 independent films
American action films
Films shot in Puerto Rico
Lionsgate films
2020s English-language films
Films directed by James Cullen Bressack
2020s American films